The 1972–73 season of the Moroccan Throne Cup is the 17th edition of the competition.

Fath Union Sport won the cup, beating Ittihad Khemisset 3–2 in the final, played for the first time at the Stade Al Inbiaâte in Agadir. Fath Union Sport won the competition for the second time in their history.

Tournament

Last 16

Quarter-finals

Semi-finals

Final 
The final took place between the two winning semi-finalists, Fath Union Sport and Ittihad Khemisset, on 22 July 1973 at the Stade Al Inbiaâte in Agadir.

Notes and references 

1972
1972 in association football
1973 in association football
1972–73 in Moroccan football